Devin Michael Oliver (born July 2, 1992) is an American professional basketball player for Yokohama B-Corsairs of the B.League. He played college basketball for Dayton.

College career
Oliver played four seasons for the Dayton Flyers. Oliver led the Flyer’s in rebounding (7.4) and assists (2.3), and was second in scoring (11.2) in 2013-14, his senior season.

Professional career
After going undrafted in the 2014 NBA draft, Oliver joined the Boston Celtics for the 2014 NBA Summer League. In July 2014, Oliver signed his first professional contract with Belgium club Limburg United.

In August 2015, Oliver signed with Israeli club Maccabi Kiryat Gat. On December 1, 2015, he parted ways with Maccabi Kiryat Gat. In March 2016, he signed with SPO Rouen Basket of France for the rest of the season.

On August 22, 2016, he signed a one-year deal with Slovenian club Union Olimpija. On July 18, 2017, he re-signed with Olimpija for one more season.

In July 2018, Oliver signed with Turkish club Banvit.

On 29 January 2019, he has signed a half year contract with s.Oliver Würzburg.

On June 27, 2019, he has signed 1-year deal contract with Nanterre 92 of the LNB Pro A.

On August 3, 2020, Oliver signed a deal with Büyükçekmece Basketbol of the Turkish Basketbol Süper Ligi (BSL) for the 2020-2021 season.

On June 17, 2021, he has signed with Sendai 89ers of the B.League.

On July 7, 2022, he has signed with Yokohama B-Corsairs of the B.League and he will wear No.15.

The Basketball Tournament (TBT) (2017–present) 
In the summer of 2017, Oliver played in The Basketball Tournament on ESPN for the Broad Street Brawlers.  He competed for the $2 million prize, and for the Brawlers, he averaged 9 rebounds per game.  Oliver helped the Brawlers reach the second round, only then losing to Team Colorado 111-95.

References

External links
 Eurobasket.com profile
 FIBA profile
 ESPN profile
 Union Olimpija profile

1992 births
Living people
African-American basketball players
American expatriate basketball people in Belgium
American expatriate basketball people in Germany
American expatriate basketball people in Israel
American expatriate basketball people in France
American expatriate basketball people in Slovenia
American expatriate basketball people in Turkey
American men's basketball players
Bandırma B.İ.K. players
Basketball players from Michigan
Dayton Flyers men's basketball players
KK Olimpija players
Limburg United players
Maccabi Kiryat Gat B.C. players
Nanterre 92 players
S.Oliver Würzburg players
Small forwards
Sportspeople from Kalamazoo, Michigan
21st-century African-American sportspeople